Wide Open Spaces is a 1924 American silent comedy film starring Stan Laurel.  It is a parody of the 1923 film Wild Bill Hickok and its original title was Wild Bill Hiccough. Gabriel Goober thwarts a stagecoach robbery by Jack McQueen and his gang.

Cast
 Stan Laurel as Gabriel Goober
 Ena Gregory
 James Finlayson as Jack McQueen
 George Rowe
 Noah Young
 Sammy Brooks
 Billy Engle as Phil Sheridan
 Charles Dudley as Abraham Lincoln
 Al Forbes as George Armstrong Custer
 Mae Laurel as Calamity Jane

References

External links

1924 films
American black-and-white films
1924 comedy films
1924 short films
Films directed by George Jeske
American silent short films
Silent American comedy films
Cultural depictions of George Armstrong Custer
Cultural depictions of Calamity Jane
Cultural depictions of Abraham Lincoln
American comedy short films
1920s American films